Maja Chwalińska was the defending champion but chose not to participate.

Ekaterine Gorgodze won the title, defeating Chloé Paquet in the final, 7–6(9–7), 0–6, 6–4.

Seeds

Draw

Finals

Top half

Bottom half

References

Main Draw

Kozerki Open - Singles